Master of Suspense is an album by trumpeter Jack Walrath which was recorded in 1986 and released on the revamped Blue Note label.

Reception

The AllMusic review by Scott Yanow stated "The biggest news of this CD by trumpeter Jack Walrath is that Willie Nelson sings and plays guitar on two numbers: "I'm Sending You a Big Bouquet of Roses" and "I'm So Lonesome I Could Cry." The other selections feature Walrath (who composed all but the two Nelson features) with a larger group than normal; a septet ... As usual Walrath's music stretches the boundaries of hard bop without tossing away its roots". The album was nominated for a Grammy.

Track listing
All compositions by Jack Walrath except where noted
 "Meat!" – 4:02
 "Children" – 5:18
 "No Mystery" – 5:58
 "A Study in Porcine" – 4:48
 "I'm Sending You a Big Bouquet of Roses" (Steve Nelson, Bob Hilliard) – 3:50
 "The Lord's Calypso" – 3:08
 "I'm So Lonesome I Could Cry" (Hank Williams) – 9:05
 "Monk on the Moon" – 5:26
 "A Hymn for the Discontented" – 6:32

Personnel
Jack Walrath – trumpet, flugelhorn
Steve Turre – trombone
Kenny Garrett – alto saxophone
Carter Jefferson – tenor saxophone
James Williams – piano
Anthony Cox – bass 
Ronnie Burrage – drums
Willie Nelson – guitar, vocals (tracks 5 & 7)

References

Blue Note Records albums
Jack Walrath albums
1987 albums